Eduard Gubler (1891–1971) was a Swiss painter.

External links

References
This article was initially translated from the German Wikipedia.

20th-century Swiss painters
Swiss male painters
1891 births
1971 deaths
20th-century Swiss male artists